Dear Canada is a series of historical novels marketed at kids  first published in 2001 and continuing to the present. The books are published by Scholastic Canada Ltd. They are similar to the Dear America series, with each book written in the form of the diary of a fictional young woman living during an important event in Canadian history. The series covers both familiar and little-known topics such as Home Children, North-West Rebellion, and the 1837 Rebellion.

Books

Orphan at My Door: The Home Child Diary of Victoria Cope, Guelph, Ontario, 1897 by Jean Little (2001)
A Prairie as Wide as the Sea: The Immigrant Diary of Ivy Weatherall, Milorie, Saskatchewan, 1926 by Sarah Ellis (2001)
With Nothing But Our Courage: The Loyalist Diary of Mary MacDonald, Johnstown, Quebec, 1783 by Karleen Bradford (2002)
Footsteps in the Snow: The Red River Diary of Isobel Scott, Rupert's Land, 1815 by Carol Matas (2002)
A Ribbon of Shining Steel: The Railway Diary of Kate Cameron, Yale, British Columbia, 1882 by Julie Lawson (2002)
Whispers of War: The War of 1812 Diary of Susanna Meritt, Niagara, Upper Canada, 1812 by Kit Pearson (2002)
Alone in an Untamed Land: The Filles du Roi Diary of Helene St. Onge, Montreal, New France, 1666 by Maxine Trottier (2003)
Brothers Far from Home: The World War I Diary of Eliza Bates, Uxbridge, Ontario, 1916 by Jean Little (2003)
An Ocean Apart: The Gold Mountain Diary of Chin Mei-ling, Vancouver, British Columbia, 1922 by Gillian Chan (2004)
A Trail of Broken Dreams: The Gold Rush Diary of Harriet Palmer, Overland to the Cariboo, 1862 by Barbara Haworth-Attard (2004)
Banished from Our Home: The Acadian Diary of Angelique Richard, Grand-Pre, Acadia, 1755 by Sharon Stewart (2004)
Winter of Peril: The Newfoundland Diary of Sophie Loveridge, Mairie's Cove, New-Found-Land, 1721 by Jan Andrews (2005)
Turned Away: The World War II Diary of Devorah Bernstein, Winnipeg, Manitoba, 1941 by Carol Matas (2005)
The Death of My Country: The Plains of Abraham Diary of Genevieve Aubuchon, Quebec, New France, 1759 by Maxine Trottier (2005)
No Safe Harbour: The Halifax Explosion Diary of Charlotte Blackburn, Halifax, Nova Scotia, 1917 by Julie Lawson (2006)
A Rebel's Daughter: The 1837 Rebellion Diary of Arabella Stevenson, Toronto, Upper Canada, 1837 by Janet Lunn (2006)
A Season for Miracles: Twelve Tales of Christmas by Jean Little, Janet Lunn, Sarah Ellis, Kit Pearson, Gillian Chan, Carol Matas, Maxine Trottier, Julie Lawson, Sharon Stewart, Barbara Haworth-Attard, Jan Andrews & Karleen Bradford (2006)
If I Die Before I Wake: The Flu Epidemic Diary of Fiona Macgregor, Toronto, Ontario, 1918 by Jean Little (2007)
Not a Nickel to Spare: The Great Depression Diary of Sally Cohen, Toronto, Ontario, 1932 by Perry Nodelman (2007)
Prisoners in the Promised Land: The Ukrainian Internment Diary of Anya Soloniuk, Spirit Lake, Quebec, 1914 by Marsha Skrypuch (2007)
Days of Toil and Tears: The Child Labour Diary of Flora Rutherford, Almonte, Ontario, 1887 by Sarah Ellis (2008)
Where the River Takes Me: The Hudson's Bay Company Diary of Jenna Sinclair, Fort Victoria, Vancouver's Island, 1849 by Julie Lawson (2008)
Blood Upon Our Land: The North West Resistance Diary of Josephine Bouvier, Batoche, District of Saskatchewan, 1885 by Maxine Trottier (2009)
A Desperate Road to Freedom: The Underground Railroad Diary of Julia May Jackson, Virginia to Canada West, 1863-1864 by Karleen Bradford (2009)
A Christmas to Remember: Tales of Comfort and Joy (2009)
Exiles from the War: The War Guests Diary of Charlotte Mary Twiss, Guelph, Ontario, 1940 by Jean Little (2010)
To Stand on My Own: The Polio Epidemic Diary of Noreen Robertson, Saskatoon, Saskatchewan, 1937 by Barbara Haworth-Attard (2010)
Hoping for Home: Stories of Arrival by Jean Little, Kit Pearson, Brian Doyle, Paul Yee, Irene N. Watts, Ruby Slipperjack, Afua Cooper, Rukhsana Khan, Marie-Andrée Clermont, Lillian Boraks-Nemetz and Shelley Tanaka (2011)
That Fatal Night: The Titanic Diary of Dorothy Wilton, Halifax, Nova Scotia, 1912 by Sarah Ellis (2011)
Torn Apart: The Internment Diary of Mary Kobayashi, Vancouver, British Columbia, 1941 by Susan Aihoshi (2012)
A Sea of Sorrows: The Typhus Epidemic Diary of Johanna Leary, Ireland to Canada East, 1847 by Norah McClintock (2012)
Pieces of the Past: The Holocaust Diary of Rose Rabinowitz, Winnipeg, Manitoba, 1948 by Carol Matas (2013)
A Country of Our Own: The Confederation Diary of Rosie Dunn, Ottawa, Province of Canada, 1866 by Karleen Bradford (2013)
All Fall Down: The Landslide Diary of Abby Roberts, Frank, District of Alberta, 1902 by Jean Little (2014)
Flame and Ashes: The Great Fire Diary of Triffie Winsor, St. John's, Newfoundland, 1892 by Janet McNaughton (2014)
A Time for Giving: Ten Tales of Christmas by Jean Little, Barbara Haworth-Attard, Sarah Ellis, Susan Aihoshi, Norah McClintock, Carol Matas, Karleen Bradford and Ruby Slipperjack (2015)
These Are My Words: The Residential School Diary of Violet Pesheens, Northern Ontario, 1966 by Ruby Slipperjack (2016)

Companion series
In September 2010, Scholastic launched a similar series marketed at boys, titled I Am Canada.

See also

My Australian Story
My Story
My Name is America
Royal Diaries

External links
 Dear Canada website

Series of children's books
Canadian children's novels
Canadian historical novels
Children's historical novels
Fictional diaries